Prison Breaker is a 1936 British crime drama film directed by Adrian Brunel and starring James Mason, Wally Patch, Marguerite Allan and George Merritt. The film was based on a novel by Edgar Wallace; its plot concerns a British secret service agent who falls in love with the daughter of a criminal.

Premise
A British secret service agent falls in love with the daughter of a leading London criminal, and soon after becoming involved with her father finds himself in prison facing a charge of manslaughter.

Cast
 James Mason as 'Bunny' Barnes  
 Marguerite Allan as Veronica  
 Wally Patch as Villars  
 Andrews Engelmann as Stiegelman  
 Ian Fleming as Stephen Shand  
 George Merritt as Goldring  
 Vincent Holman as Jackman  
 Tarva Penna as Macallum  
 Aubrey Mallalieu as Sir Douglas Mergin  
 Neville Brook as Lord Beldam  
 Andreas Malandrinos as Supello

References

External links

1936 films
1936 crime drama films
British crime drama films
British thriller films
Films directed by Adrian Brunel
Films set in London
Films set in England
Films based on British novels
Films based on works by Edgar Wallace
British black-and-white films
1930s English-language films
1930s British films